Joaquín Garrigues Walker (30 September 1933 – 28 July 1980) was a Spanish politician from the Union of the Democratic Centre (UCD) who served as Deputy Minister to the Prime Minister, without portfolio from April 1979 to May 1980 and previously as Minister of Public Works and Urbanism from July 1977 to April 1979.

References

1933 births
1980 deaths
Complutense University of Madrid alumni
Government ministers of Spain
20th-century Spanish politicians
Public works ministers of Spain